Granada is a trilogy by the Egyptian author, Radwa Ashour. The trilogy consists of three novels: Granada, Maryama, and Departure.

The events of the novel revolve around the kingdom of Granada after the fall of all Islamic kingdoms in Andulsia. The novel starts in 1491; the year of Andulsia's fall after the announcing the treaty which stated Boabdil's resignation from the throne to the kings of Castille and Aragon. The novel ends with the characters’ resistance to depopulating Muslims after realizing that leaving Andalusia is more like dying than staying in it is.  

Several editions of the novel were published. The first edition was published by Dar Al-Hilal Publishing in two volumes between 1994 and 1995. The second edition was published by the Arab Institute for Research & Publishing in 1998. The third edition was published by Dar El-Shorouk Publishing in 2001. The fourth edition was a special edition exclusive to Al-Usra Library, and it was published by Dar El-Shorouk in 2004. Finally, the fifth edition was also published by Dar El-Shorouk in 2005.

In 2003, the Arabic PhD at Harvard, William Granara, translated the novel into English. The translation was published by Syracuse University in New York.

Main Characters

Abu Jaafar 
He is a calligrapher who owns a shop in Al-Warraqin Neighbourhood and lives in Al-Bayazzin Neighbourhood in Granada. He also owns a house in a place known as “Aynul Dam’i” or “Tear’s Eye.” He is a father to one child, and a grandfather to two, Hassan and Salima, whom he takes care of in his house in Al-Bayazzin Neighbourhood – after the death of their father. Umm Jaafar and Umm Hassan live with them, and Nai’m and Saad work with him in his shop.

Umm Jaafar 
Abu Jaafar's wife, and Hassan and Salima's grandmother.

Na’im   
Works in Abu Jaafar's shop in Al-Warraqin Neighbourhood. A strong friendship forms between him and Saad due to working and living together at the shop. After Abu Jaafar's death, he moves to work at Eskafi's shop, who is a shoemaker.

Umm Hassan   
Abu Jaafar's son's wife, and Hassan and Salima's mother.

Saad 
He used to be a servant for one of the men before he this man gets kicked out by Abu Mansur and humiliates him publicly, in addition to trying to hit him. All of this does not affect Saad; he does not even try and follow this man – his master. After several days, he goes to Abu Mansur who refers him Al-Warraqin Neighbourhood where his friend – Abu Jaafar – will find a job for Saad. After working at Abu Jaafar's shop, a friendship between him and Na’im blossoms. He also married Salima, Abu Jaafar's granddaughter, and after Abu Jaafar's death, goes to work at Abu Mansur's bath.

Hassan   
Abu Jaafar's grandson. He works as a calligrapher like his grandfather, and he marries Maryama.

Salima 
Abu Jaafar's granddaughter and Hassan's sister. She marries Saad.

Hisham 
Hassan and Maryama's son, and he married Aisha.

Aisha 
Salima and Saad's daughter, and she marries Hisham and has Ali.

Ali 
One of the heroes in the novel, and he is Aisha and Hisham's son, and Maryama and Hassan's grandson.

About The Trilogy 
Ali Al-Ra'I said that the trilogy allows intense historical events to explode right before the reader's eyes.  

Latina Az-Zayat said that the language used in ‘Granada’ is one of memory. This nostalgia is what results in the richness, rhythm, and poetic-ness of the language. This language leads to diversity in both, narration and description.  

Jaber Asfour said that ‘Granada’ gives voice to the oppressors where staying alive is heroic in a hostile world which oppresses an entire history.

Sabri Hafiz said that Ashour's trilogy is the first astounding trilogy written by a woman in Arabic fiction, standing alongside Naguib Mahfouz's trilogy.

Farida An-Naqash said that the novel makes the soul shudder.

Granada 
Granada is the first novel in the ‘Granada Trilogy,’ and it was published in 1994. The novel received the Best Novel of 1994 Award from Cairo's International Book Expo.

Maryama 
Maryama is the second novel in the trilogy, and it was published in the same edition as ‘Departure’ in 1995. Both ‘Granada’ and ‘Departure’ received the first prize of the first Arab Woman Book Expo in Cairo 1995.

Departure 
Departure is the third novel in the trilogy. It was published in the same edition as ‘Maryama’ in 1995. Both ‘Granada’ and ‘Departure’ received the first prize of the first Arab Woman Book Expo in Cairo 1995.

References 

Arabic literature
Egyptian writers
Egyptian literature
Historical fiction